Mark Kellogg may refer to:

 Mark Kellogg (reporter), first Associated Press correspondent to die in the line of duty; killed at the Battle of the Little Bighorn
 Mark Kellogg (musician), principal trombonist of the Rochester Philharmonic Orchestra